The Capt. Isaac N. Deadrick House is a historic house on the west side of Arkansas Highway 163, a short way north of its junction with United States Route 64 in the community of Levesque, Arkansas.  It is a two-story wood frame T-shaped structure, probably built around 1850 by the slaves of the father-in-law of Isaac N. Deadrick, a prominent early settler of the area who later served as captain of a cavalry company in the Confederate Army.  It is the oldest known house in Cross County, and has been extensively altered, although much of its original structure is discernible.  It is five bays wide, with a central entry on the main (eastern) facade that is flanked by sidelight windows and topped by a transom window.  On the second floor above this entry is another door, which (unlike the present main door) is probably original to the house.

The house was listed on the National Register of Historic Places in 1993, at which time it was reported to be in deteriorating condition.  It was delisted in 2022.

See also
National Register of Historic Places listings in Cross County, Arkansas

References

Houses on the National Register of Historic Places in Arkansas
Greek Revival houses in Arkansas
Houses completed in 1850
Houses in Cross County, Arkansas
National Register of Historic Places in Cross County, Arkansas
Former National Register of Historic Places in Arkansas